SurVision is an international English-language surrealist poetry project, comprising an online magazine and a book-publishing outlet. SurVision magazine, founded in March 2017 by poet Anatoly Kudryavitsky, is a platform for surrealist poetry from Ireland and the world. SurVision Books, the book imprint, started up the following year.

SurVision Magazine 

SurVision publishes a biannual magazine of the same name, containing surrealist poetry, including translations from other languages. The magazine has been noted for the range of its contributors, who have included both established and new writers from Ireland and other parts of the world. The Dublin Review of Books has called it "currently the only international magazine devoted exclusively to surrealist poetry."

The Munich-based German-language Signaturen Magazine announced that they will be publishing German translations of the best poems from SurVision. In an interview with Signaturen, Anatoly Kudryavitsky described the magazine's editorial policy:

In 2018, John W. Sexton's poem "The Snails" which appeared in SurVision magazine was shortlisted for An Post'''s Irish Poem of the Year.

 The James Tate International Poetry Prize 
Since 2018, SurVision has awarded the annual James Tate International Poetry prize for the most favoured collection of surrealist poems. So far, the prize has always been shared between two poets. The prize was named in honour of the writer and poet James Tate.

 SurVision Books 
SurVision started publishing books in April 2018. The first two titles in the New Poetics series were 34-page chapbooks by Noelle Kocot and the Irish surrealist poet Ciaran O'Driscoll. More books followed, including a chapbook by the US Surrealist poet Elin O'Hara Slavick, two full-size collections by the US Surrealist poet George Kalamaras, and Selected Poems by the German poet Anton G. Leitner; in early 2019, chapbooks by English experimental poet Helen Ivory and Irish poets John W. Sexton, Afric McGlinchey, Tony Kitt, and Tim Murphy; and in 2020, chapbooks by Irish poets Matthew Geden and Tony Bailie. Anthologies of contemporary Surrealist poetry from Ireland and Russia were also published in 2020, followed by an anthology of Ukrainian poetry about the war edited by Tony Kitt and published in April 2022.

In his detailed review in Poetry Ireland Trumpet of three collections of work by Irish poets, Michael S. Begnal has written that "SurVision is a press that brings energy and excitement to Irish poetry."

According to a MEAS report containing a statistical analysis of Irish poetry publications, SurVision Books was the joint-second most prolific poetry press on the island of Ireland in 2018.

 Notable contributors 

Adam Aitken
Peter Boyle
Patrick Chapman
Patrick Deeley
Alison Dunhill
Janet Hamill
Philip Hammial
Helen Ivory
George Kalamaras
Noelle Kocot			
Medbh McGuckian
Mary O'Donnell
Ciaran O'Driscoll
John Olson			
Dilys Rose	
Stuart Ross
John W. Sexton	
G. C. Waldrep
Les Wicks	
Dean Young

Publications
Collections of poetry
 George Kalamaras, That Moment of Wept , and Through the Silk-Heavy Rains 
 Anton G. Leitner, Selected Poems 1981-2015. Translated from German. 

Anthologies
 Seeds of Gravity: An Anthology of Contemporary Surrealist Poetry from Ireland (2020) 
 MESSAGE-DOOR: An Anthology of Contemporary Surrealist Poetry from Russia, bilingual English/Russian (2020) 
 Invasion: Ukrainian Poems about the War, ed. by Tony Kitt (2022) 

 Chapbook series (highlights) 
 Noelle Kocot, Humanity. 
 Ciaran O'Driscoll, The Speaking Trees. 
 Elin O'Hara Slavick, Cameramouth. 
 Anatoly Kudryavitsky, Stowaway. 
 Helen Ivory, Maps of the Abandoned City. 
 John W. Sexton, Inverted Night. 
 Alison Dunhill, As Pure as Coal Dust''.

References

External links 
 Editor's interview in Signaturen Magazine
 SurVision at Poets & Writers Database

2017 establishments in Ireland
Poetry literary magazines
English-language magazines
Literary magazines published in Ireland
Magazines established in 2017
Biannual magazines
Irish poetry
Poetry publishers
Literary publishing companies
Publishing companies of Ireland
Book publishing companies of Ireland
Mass media in Dublin (city)